Alchemy of Souls is a South Korean television series starring Lee Jae-wook, Jung So-min, Go Youn-jung, and Hwang Min-hyun. Written by the Hong sisters, it depicts the stories of young mages dealing with heaven and earth. It aired from June 18, 2022 to January 8, 2023, on tvN's Saturdays and Sundays at 21:10 (KST) time slot. It is also available for streaming on TVING and Netflix in selected regions.

The series was divided into two parts: Part 1 aired from June 18 to August 28, 2022 for 20 episodes, while Part 2 (Alchemy of Souls: Light and Shadow) aired from December 10, 2022 to January 8, 2023 for 10 episodes.

Series overview

Synopsis

Part 1
Set in a fictional country called Daeho, the series is about the love and growth of young mages as they overcome their twisted fates due to a forbidden magic spell known as the "alchemy of souls", which allows souls to switch bodies.

It follows the story of an elite warrior named Nak-su whose soul is accidentally trapped inside the weak body of Mu-deok. She becomes entangled with Jang Uk who is from a noble family, becomes his servant and master, and teaches Uk her skills as they both fall in love with each other.

Part 2
Three years after the tragedy that led Mu-deok to run wild and kill innocent people, engineered by Jin Mu, Jang Uk, who returned from the dead as a result of the powerful Ice Stone inside his body, becomes a ruthless hunter of soul shifters and becomes increasingly isolated due to his heartbreak over the death of his love—Mu-deok. He then meets the mysterious heiress of Jinyowon, Jin Bu-yeon, who resembles Nak-su.

Cast

Main
 Lee Jae-wook as Jang Uk
 Park Sang-hoon as young Jang Uk
 Jung So-min as Mu-deok / Nak-su (after alchemy of souls) / Jin Bu-yeon (Mu-deok's birth name)
 Go Youn-jung as Nak-su (before alchemy of souls) / Cho Yeong (real name) / Jin Bu-yeon (in part 2)
 Gu Yoo-jung as young Nak-su
 Hwang Min-hyun as Seo Yul
 Moon Seong-hyun as young Seo Yul

Supporting

Jang family
 Oh Na-ra as Maidservant Kim Yeon
 Joo Sang-wook as Jang Gang
 Bae Gang-hee as Do-hwa
 Jang Tae-min as Servant Lee

Seo family
 Do Sang-woo as Seo Yun-oh

Songrim
 Yoo Jun-sang as Park Jin
 Yoo In-soo as Park Dang-gu
 Lee Ha-yool as Sang-ho

Sejukwon
 Lee Do-kyung as Heo Yeom
 Hong Seo-hee as Heo Yun-ok
 Jung Ji-an as Soon-yi
 Kim Yong-jin as Physician Seo

Cheonbugwan
 Jo Jae-yoon as Jin Mu
 Choi Ji-ho as Gil-ju
 Cha Yong-hak as Yeom-su
 Lee Ji-hoo as Cha Beom
 Lee Bong-jun as Gu Hyo
 Joo Min-soo as Han Yeol

Jin family (Jinyowon)
 Park Eun-hye as Jin Ho-gyeong
 Joo Seok-tae as Jin Woo-tak
 Arin as Jin Cho-yeon
 Yoon Hae-bin as young Jin Bu-yeon

Royal family
 Shin Seung-ho as Go Won
 Choi Kwang-il as Go Soon
 Kang Kyung-heon / Shim So-young as Seo Ha-sun
 Park Byung-eun as Go Seong
 Lee Ki-seop as Eunuch Oh
 Jeong Ji-sun as Eunuch Kim

Chwiseollu
 Park So-jin as Joo-wol

Others
 Im Chul-soo as Lee Cheol (Master Lee)
 Seo Hye-won as So-yi
 as Yong-pil
 Woo Hyun as Monk Ho-yeon

Extended
 Jeon Hye-won as Ae-hyang
 Yoon Seo-hyun as Cho Chung
 Shim Jae-hyun as a thug
 Kim Cheol-yoon as Byeong-gu

Special appearances
 Yeom Hye-ran as a mysterious middle-aged woman
 
 Kim Hyun-sook as Maidservant Park
 Jang Sung-beom as Master Kang
 Lee Jun-hyeok as a merchant
 Kim Dae-gon as a merchant
 Lee Chae-min as a merchant

Production

Development
Preparations for the series, as well as program discussion with tvN, started in 2019 under the working title Can This Person Be Translated.

Casting
In January 2021, Park Hye-su's agency revealed that the actress auditioned for Alchemy of Souls. In June, it was announced that actor Joo Sang-wook was offered a role in the series.

However, in July 2021, she decided to leave the series after a mutual agreement with the production team. It was stated that although Park is a rookie actress, she prepared hard for the series, but felt a lot of pressure about playing the main character of a big project. The role was then offered to actress Jung So-min. Jung and director Park Joon-hwa previously worked together in 2017 TV series Because This Is My First Life.

Line-up for the lead stars consisting of Lee Jae-wook, Jung So-min, Hwang Min-hyun, Shin Seung-ho, Yoo Jun-sang, Oh Na-ra and Jo Jae-yoon was officially announced by tvN on March 3, 2022. On March 21, Yoo In-soo, Arin, Park Eun-hye, Lee Do-kyung and Im Chul-soo were announced to have joined the cast.

After the end of part 1 in August 2022, the female lead actress Jung So-min was replaced by Go Youn-jung for part 2, after she previously portrayed the original identity for Jung's character in a cameo in part 1.

Filming
In August 2021, production companies Studio Dragon and High Quality signed an agreement with Mungyeong City to build a filming site in Maseong-myeon worth  for the production of Alchemy of Souls.

Filming locations include Nongwoljeong Pavilion in Hwarim-dong Valley, Hamyang County, Goseokjeong Pavilion in Cheorwon County, and CJ ENM Studio Center in Paju. The tree shown in the fictional place called Danhyanggok is located on the lower reaches of the Geumgang River in Garimseong Fortress, Buyeo County. Post-production began as filming began in the summer of 2021.

On October 6, 2021, it was announced that filming of the series was canceled for that week after a staff member tested positive for COVID-19 on the morning of the 5th. All production crew members subsequently underwent PCR tests. Some staff members who were classified as close contacts went into self-quarantine, even though they tested negative for the contagion.

It was reported that filming for the second part of the series had started by July 2022, and was completed on October 6.

Original soundtrack

Part 1

The album peaked at number 18 on weekly Circle Album Chart and as of September 2022, 8,906 copies have been sold.

Part 1

Part 2

Part 3

Part 4

Part 5

Part 6

Part 7

Part 2

Part 1

Part 2

Part 3

Reception

Viewership

Streaming
Alchemy of Souls ranked second, tied with Our Blues, in streaming for Netflix Korea TV show category from January to December 22, 2022.

Awards and nominations

Notes

References

External links
  
 
 
 
 
 
 
 Alchemy of Souls at Naver 
 
 
 Alchemy of Souls: Light and Shadow at Naver 

Korean-language television shows
Korean-language Netflix exclusive international distribution programming
TVN (South Korean TV channel) television dramas
Television shows written by the Hong sisters
Television series by Studio Dragon
South Korean fantasy television series
South Korean romance television series
South Korean historical television series
South Korean action television series
2022 South Korean television series debuts
2023 South Korean television series endings
Television productions suspended due to the COVID-19 pandemic